is the founding director of the International Arctic Research Center of the University of Alaska Fairbanks (UAF), serving in that position from the center's establishment in 1998 until January 2007. Previously he had been director of the university's Geophysical Institute from 1986.

Background

Akasofu earned a B.S. and a M.S. in geophysics at Tohoku University, Sendai, Japan, in 1953 and 1957, respectively. He earned a Ph.D in geophysics at UAF in 1961. Within the framework of his Ph.D. thesis he studied the aurora. His scientific adviser  was Sydney Chapman. Akasofu has been a professor of geophysics at UAF since 1964.

Akasofu was director of the Geophysical Institute from 1986 until 1999, during which time the Alaska Volcano Observatory was established and Poker Flat Research Range was modernized. He went on to become the first director of the International Arctic Research Center (IARC) upon its establishment in 1998, and remained in that position until 2007. The same year, the building which houses IARC was named in his honor.

Akasofu has served as an Associate Editor of the Journal of Geophysical Research (1972–74) and the Journal of Geomagnetism & Geoelectricity (1972–present), respectively. Furthermore, he has served as a member of the Editorial Advisory Board of the Planetary Space Science (1969–present), the Editorial Advisory Board of Space Science Reviews (1967–77), and the Editorial Committee of Space Science Reviews (1977–present). As a graduate student, Akasofu was one of the first to understand that the northern aurora was actually an aurora of light surrounding the North Magnetic Pole.

Climate change 
Akasofu does not accept the scientific consensus on climate change that it is anthropogenic. In 2006, he testified to the United States Senate Committee on Commerce, Science, and Transportation (Subcommittee on Global Climate Change and Impacts) that “… we have at least two firm scientific indicators that show it is incorrect to conclude that this warming in the continental Arctic is due entirely to the greenhouse effect caused by man.” He instead ascribes warming to natural variation and has stated that "… climate change, or temperature, has been rising. Somehow the IPCC decided that the increase in the last 100 years is due to the greenhouse effect; however, a significant part of that would be just due to natural change. So, even if we spend lots of money on suppressing CO2 release, it wouldn’t do any good, because it’s a natural change."

Akasofu presented a talk on "Natural Causes of 20th Century Warming: Recovery from the Little Ice Age and Oscillatory Change" at the Heartland Institute's 2nd International Conference on Climate Change in New York (2009). In the scientific literature, he claimed that the "rise in global average temperature over the last century has halted since roughly the year 2000, despite the fact that the release of CO2 into the atmosphere is still increasing" and that "this interruption has been caused by the suspension of the near linear (+ 0.5 °C/100 years or 0.05 °C/10 years) temperature increase over the last two centuries, due to recovery from the Little Ice Age". These claims were shown to be "not connected to any physical phenomenon; rather ... a result of a simplistic and incorrect curve-fitting operation". Global average temperature rose approximately 0.5 °C between 2000 and 2020.

Selected publications

He is an ISI highly cited researcher.

 Akasofu, S.-I., Polar and Magnetospheric Substorms, D. Reidel Pub. Co., Dordrecht, Holland, 1968, (also a Russian edition).
 Akasofu, S.-I., B. Fogle, and B. Haurwitz, Sydney Chapman, Eighty, published by the National Center for Atmospheric Research and the Publishing Service of the University of Colorado, 1968.
 Akasofu, S.-I. and S. Chapman, Solar-Terrestrial Physics, Clarendon Press, Oxford, England, 1972, (also a Russian and Chinese edition).
 Akasofu, S.-I., The Aurora: A Discharge Phenomenon Surrounding the Earth, (in Japanese), Chuo-koran- sha, Tokyo, Japan.
 Akasofu, S.-I., Physics of Magnetospheric Substorms, D. Reidel, Pub. Co., Dordrecht, Holland, 1977.
 Akasofu, S.-I., Aurora Borealis: The Amazing Northern Lights, Alaska Geographic Society, Alaska Northwest Pub. Co., 6, 2, 1979, (also a Japanese edition).
 Akasofu, S.-I. (ed.), Dynamics of the Magnetosphere, D. Reidel Pub. Co., Dordrecht, Holland, 1979.
 Akasofu, S.-I. and J.R. Kan (eds.), Physics of Auroral Arc Formation, Am. Geophys. Union, Washington, D.C., 1981.
 Akasofu, S.-I. and Y. Kamide (eds.), The Solar Wind and the Earth, Geophys. Astrophys. Monographs, Terra Scientific Pub. Co., Tokyo, Japan, and D. Reidel Pub. Co., Dordrecht, Holland, 1987.
 Akasofu, S.-I., Secrets of the Aurora Borealis, Alaska Geographic Society, Banta Publications Group/Hart Press, Vol. 29, No. 1, 2002.
 Akasofu, S.-I. Exploring the Secrets of the Aurora, Kluwer Academic Publishers, Netherlands, 2002.

Awards and honors

 1976 - Chapman Medal, Royal Astronomical Society
 1977 - The Japan Academy of Sciences Award
 1979 - Fellow of the American Geophysical Union (AGU)
 1979 - John Adam Fleming Medal, AGU
 1980 - Named a Distinguished Alumnus by UAF
 1981 - Named one of the "1,000 Most-Cited Contemporary Scientists by Current Contents
 1985 - First recipient of the Sydney Chapman Chair professorship, UAF
 1985 - Special Lecture for the Emperor of Japan on the aurora (October 3)
 1986 - Member of the International Academy of Aeronautics, Paris
 1987 - Named one of the "Centennial Alumni" by the National Association of State Universities and Land Grant Colleges
 1993 - Japan Foreign Minister's Award for Promoting International Relations and Cultural Exchange between Japan and Alaska
 1996 - Japan Posts and Telecommunications Minister Award for Contributions to the US-Japan Joint Project on Environmental Science in Alaska
 1997 - Edith R. Bullock Prize for Excellence, University of Alaska
 1999 - Alaskan of the Year - Denali Award
 2002 - Named one of the "World's Most Cited Authors in Space Physics" by Current Contents ISI
 2003 - Order of the Sacred Treasures, Gold and Silver Stars by the Emperor of Japan
 2011 - European Geosciences Union, Hannes Alfvén Medal

References

External links
Syun-Ichi Akasofu at the International Arctic Research Center

1930 births
Living people
People from Nagano Prefecture
People from Fairbanks, Alaska
American geophysicists
Japanese climatologists
Recipients of the Order of the Sacred Treasure, 2nd class
Tohoku University alumni
University of Alaska Fairbanks alumni
University of Alaska Fairbanks faculty
American academics of Japanese descent
Fellows of the American Geophysical Union
Japanese emigrants to the United States
Japanese geophysicists